Junaid Khan; (b.1857/62–1938) was a Turkmen tribal leader who became the Chief of the Armed Forces and later the de facto and last ruler of the Khanate of Khiva.

Born into the Turkmen tribe of Yomut, Muhammet Gurban was the son of a tribal chieftain Khojibay, after whose death he assumed the leadership of the tribe. Gaining authority during the Turkmen uprisings of 1912-1916, Junaid was granted enormous power within the Khanate by the then Khan of Khiva Isfandiyar, who sought to lessen the growing Turkmen threat. However, after a short period of time Junaid arranged Isfandiyar's assassination and later enthroned the murdered Khan's uncle Sayid Abdullah as a puppet ruler, while himself becoming the real master of the Khanate.

Disillusioned with his ineffective policies that ultimately led to a new revolt, a number of influential leaders of other Turkmen tribes and Uzbek population appealed to Bolsheviks, who were gaining foothold in Russian Turkestan after the October Revolution. In 1919, under the pretext of assisting rebels, Bolsheviks invaded the Khanate and soon captured its capital Khiva. Junaid fled to the Karakum Desert with the remnants of his troops from where he organized active resistance to the emerging Soviet government.

Biography before 1917 
Born in 1857 (according to other sources in 1862), Junaid Khan was the son of Khojibay, a powerful leader of the Yomut (Turkmen) tribe of Junaids and a wealthy man. Muhammet-Kurban himself, despite his illiteracy, also enjoyed relevant authority among his tribesmen, which allowed him to become first kazi (judge) in the village, and later a water distributor (mirab).

Rise to power in Khiva 

In September 1917, after the overthrow of the government of young (revolutionary) Khivans, who had advocated reform and wished to limit the power of the Khan of Khiva Asfandiyar Khan, Muhammet-Kurban Serdar arrived to the capital. By uniting previously warring Turkmen tribes and establishing close relations with Colonel , the head of the detachment sent to Khiva by the Provisional Government of Russia, he became one of the most influential people in the Khanate.

In January 1918, Asfandiyar Khan appointed Muhammet-Kurban as the commander of the armed forces of the Khanate, bestowing on him the title "Serdar-Karim" ("noble commander"). After Zaitsev's detachment from Khiva recaptured Tashkent from Bolsheviks and Left Social Revolutionaries, the Junaid Khan's detachment, numbering about 1,600 horsemen, became the main military force in the Khanate.

Dissatisfaction with Asfandiyar’s policy greatly increased in Khiva and in the spring of 1918, Junaid Khan organized a military coup, which overthrew and put to death Asfandiyar. Later he seized power for himself almost without resistance. An ucnle of Asfandiyar Khan, Sayyid Abdullah became a new (puppet) Khan.

Having defeated and expelled by mid-September 1918 his main adversaries in the Khanate – the Turkmen leaders of Koshmammet Khan, Gulam-ali, Shamyrat-Bakhshi – Muhammed-Kurban actually became the ruler of Khiva.

Clashes with the Red Army 

After the 1917 Bolshevik seizure of power in the October Revolution, anti-monarchists and Turkmen tribesmen joined forces with the Bolsheviks at the end of 1919 to depose the khan. By early February 1920, the Khivan army under Junaid Khan was completely defeated. On 2 February 1920, Khiva's last khan, Sayyid Abdullah, abdicated and a short-lived Khorezm People's Soviet Republic (later the Khorezm SSR) was created out of the territory of the old Khanate of Khiva, before it was finally incorporated into the Soviet Union in 1924. The former Khanate was divided between the new Turkmen SSR and Uzbek SSR. 

Junaid Khan later waged numerous wars for several years with the emerging Soviet Turkestan and later with constituent republics of Soviet Central Asia for different reasons: to keep Khiva independent from Soviet rule, to recapture lost territories of the Khanate during the years as Russian protectorate, as well as to accumulate wealth. Though initially some of his battles were successful, he lost the most important ones and finally fled first to Persia and then to Afghanistan where he eventually died in 1938.

See also
 Yomuds
 Turkmens
 Asfandiyar Khan
 Khanate of Khiva
 Russian conquest of Central Asia
 The Great Game
 Khorezm People's Soviet Republic
 Soviet Turkestan
 Khorezm
 Basmachi movement

Literature 
 D. M. Abdullahanov: Tarki Dunyo, Tashkent 2009.

References

External links
"Russian Invasion (the end of the XIX century)"
"The dramatic end of Khiva"
Map of the Khanates of Bukhara, Khiva, and Khokand and Part of Russian Turkistan from 1875 by Eugene Schuyler

People from Daşoguz Region
Khanate of Khiva
Central Asia in the Russian Empire
Lists of khans
Russian anti-communists